Thomas Zhang Huai-xin (23 May 1925 – 8 May 2016) was a Chinese Catholic bishop.

Ordained to the priesthood in 1960, Zhang Huai-Xin was consecrated bishop of the Roman Catholic Diocese of Weihui, China, in 1981 and served until his death in 2016.

See also

Notes

1925 births
2016 deaths
21st-century Roman Catholic bishops in China
20th-century Roman Catholic bishops in China